Italy competed at the 1972 European Athletics Indoor Championships in Grenoble, France, from 11 to 12 March 1972.

Medalists
In this edition of the championships, Italy did not win any medals.

Top eight
Two Italian athletes reached the top eight in this edition of the championships.
Men

Women

See also
 Italy national athletics team

References

External links
 EAA official site 

1972
1972 European Athletics Indoor Championships
1972 in Italian sport